Shandong Technology and Business University (formerly Shandong Institute of Business and Technology and China Coal Economic College) was established in December 1985 with the approval of the former Ministry of Education. It is located in Yantai, Shandong Province, China. It was the only Finance and Economics University of the former Ministry of Coal Industry.

History 
SDIBT was built by the Central government and Shandong Province and is primarily managed by the province. In November 1997 SDIBT was successful in meeting the requirements and standards of the undergraduate educational evaluation by the former Ministry of Education. In December 2003, the Education Ministry evaluated bachelor degree teaching standards. SDIBT was successful in meeting the standards. In February 2003, the State Ministry of Education gave approval for the institute to change its original name, Shandong Technology and Business University (STBU), to Shandong Institute of Business and Technology (SDIBT), but in late 2018 the original name was restored.

Facilities 
SDIBT is known as the “Garden and Intellectual Campus” at the provincial level. The campus has an area of 1,392 mu and covers over 370,000 square meters. The school hosts  a library of 1736,500 volumes of books. It has fixed assets of over RMB 50,000,000.

SDIBT has more than 1,000 staff, including over 700 teachers, 100 professors and 209 associate professors; 144 doctorate degree holders (including those currently undertaking doctorate studies) and 355 master's degree holders. Six experts enjoy State council special pension and more than 20 people have obtained the title of “National Excellent Teachers”, “Young and middle-aged Provincial-ranking Experts with Outstanding Contribution”, “First Ten Young and Middle-aged Jurisconsults” and “Theoretic Talents in One-hundred-talent Program of Shandong Province”. SDITB receives students from across China. At present, over 18,600 students attend regular full- time courses in the day. About 90% of the students who graduated from SDIBT won jobs at first attempt.

Academics 
17 departments operate in the university: School of Management Science and Engineering, School of Business Administration, School of Accounting, School of Public Management, School of Economics, School of Statistics, School of Law, Department of Social Science, School of Foreign Studies and Literature, College of Mathematics and Information Science, College of Information and Electronic Engineering, Sino-Canada Higher Applied Technology College, College of International Business, School of International Exchanges, School of Adults Education,  Department of Sports and the Sino-Singapore Computer School .

STBU offers 31 undergraduate programs: Business Management, Marketing, Human Resources Management, Labor and Social Insurance, Administration, Management Science, Information Management and Information System, Industry Engineering, Engineering Management, Economics, International Economy and Trade, Finance, Banking, Electronic Commerce, Law, Politics and Administration, Information and Calculating Science, Mathematics and Applied Mathematics, Computer Science and Technology, Electronic Information Engineering, Electronic Engineering and Automation, Information Engineering, Accounting, Financial Management, English, Statistics, Social Work, Auditing, Logistics Management, Editing and Publication and Japanese .

The 13 research institutes include Island economics research institute, Enterprise development and creation research institute and Coal economic research institute. Nine labs have been built including Dummy Real and visualization technology lab and E-commercialCenteretc. The four provincial key disciplines are: “Management Science and Engineering”, Enterprise Management, Statistics and Constitutional Law and Administrative Law.

SDIBT views international cooperation positively and has set up relationships in academic exchanges and cooperation with universities from Canada, Russia, Germany, Australia, Korea, Japan, Singapore and many other countries. SDIBT has been given the approval to admit foreign students and Sino-overseas cooperation in running schools.

In only 20-some years, SDIBT has become a comprehensive finance and economics university It emphasizes teaching, focused on academic research. It promoted reforms such as motivation, and embracing school motto of “With Management and Economics Prosperity, Comes Wisdom and Compassion”. SDIBT implements the strategy of “ Supported by Discipline, Strengthened by Talents, Prospered by Unique Characteristics”. At the same time it constructs a peaceful and harmonious campus, and environmental campus actively and striving for construction of high level university of finance and economics in Shandong.

External links
Official website of Shandong Technology and Business University

Universities and colleges in Shandong
Educational institutions established in 1985
1985 establishments in China